Gesang der Jünglinge (literally "Song of the Youths") is an electronic music work by Karlheinz Stockhausen. It was realized in 1955–56 at the Westdeutscher Rundfunk studio in Cologne and is Work Number 8 in the composer's catalog. The vocal parts were supplied by 12-year-old Josef Protschka. It is exactly 13 minutes, 14 seconds long.

The work, routinely described as "the first masterpiece of electronic music" and "an opus, in the most emphatic sense of the term", is significant in that it seamlessly integrates electronic sounds with the human voice by means of matching voice resonances with pitch and creating sounds of phonemes electronically. In this way, for the first time ever it successfully brought together the two opposing worlds of the purely electronically generated German elektronische Musik and the French musique concrète, which transforms recordings of acoustical events. Gesang der Jünglinge is also noted for its early use of spatiality; it was originally in five-channel sound, which was later reduced to just four channels (mixed to monaural and later to stereo for commercial recording release).

History
In the autumn of 1954, Stockhausen conceived the idea of composing a mass for electronic sounds and voices. According to his official biographer, Stockhausen regarded this mass as a sacred work written from personal conviction, and asked his mentor, the director of the WDR electronic studio Herbert Eimert, to write to the Diocesan office of the Archbishop of Cologne for permission to have the work performed in the Cologne Cathedral. Stockhausen was bitterly disappointed when the request was refused on grounds that loudspeakers had no place in church. Although there is no doubt about Stockhausen's ambition to create an electronic mass, nor that he was frustrated by the lack of assurance that a suitable sacred venue or worship service would be sanctioned by the church, it is equally certain that "he never made an official request to the General Vicariate of the Archdiocese of Cologne and, therefore, never could have received an official response from them, whatever the result might have been". Furthermore, there is no evidence at all that Eimert, who was a Protestant, ever broached the subject even informally with Johannes Overath, the responsible official in the Cologne archdiocese at the time (as well as a member of the Broadcasting Council from 2 March 1955), so that the version of the story presented by Kurtz cannot be sustained on the basis of contemporary records.

Materials and form
There are three basic types of material used: (1) electronically generated sine tones, (2) electronically generated pulses (clicks), and (3) filtered white noise. To these is added the recorded voice of a boy soprano, which incorporates elements of all three types: vowels are harmonic spectra, which may be conceived as based on sine tones; fricatives and sibilants are like filtered noises; plosives resemble impulses. Each of these may be composed along a scale running from discrete events to massed "complexes" structured statistically. The last category occurs in Stockhausen's electronic music for the first time in Gesang der Jünglinge, and originates in the course of studies Stockhausen took between 1954 and 1956 with Werner Meyer-Eppler at the University of Bonn.

The text of Gesang der Jünglinge is from a Biblical story in the Book of Daniel where Nebuchadnezzar throws Shadrach, Meshach, and Abednego into a fiery furnace but miraculously they are unharmed and begin to sing praises to God. This text is presented in a carefully devised scale of seven degrees of comprehensibility, an idea which also came from Werner Meyer-Eppler's seminars.

Influence on popular music
Key aspects of the arrangement of Tomorrow Never Knows, the final track of The Beatles' 1966 studio album Revolver was inspired by Gesang der Jünglinge. Tomorrow Never Knows is credited as a Lennon–McCartney song, but was written primarily by John Lennon with major contributions to the arrangement by Paul McCartney. The track included looped tape effects. For the track, McCartney supplied a bag of -inch audio tape loops he had made at home after listening to Gesang der Jünglinge. The Beatles would continue to use similar efforts with Revolution 9, a track produced in 1968 for The White Album that also made use of sound collage.

References

Cited sources 

 
 
 
 {{Wikicite|ref=|reference=Kohl, Jerome. 1998. "Guest Editor's Introduction" to "A Seventieth-Birthday Festschrift for Karlheinz Stockhausen (Part One)". Perspectives of New Music 36, no. 1 (Winter): 59–64.}}
 
 
 
  Part Two

Further reading

 . 2008. Sacrificium intellectus: Das Opfer des Verstandes in der Kunst von Karlheinz Stockhausen, Botho Strauß und Anselm Kiefer. Munich: Wilhelm Fink Verlag. .
 Decroupet, Pascal. 1993. "Bilan intermédiaire: À propos de Gesang der Jünglinge de Karlheinz Stockhausen". Mitteilungen der Paul Sacher Stiftung, no. 6 (March): 23–25.
 Decroupet, Pascal. 1994. "Timbre Diversification in Serial Tape Music and Its Consequence on Form". Contemporary Music Review, 10, no. 2:13–23.
 Decroupet, Pascal. 1995. "Rätsel der Zahlenquadrate: Funktion und Permutation in der seriellen Musik von Boulez und Stockhausen". Positionen: Beiträge zur Neuen Musik, no. 23 (May): 25–29.
 Decroupet, Pascal. 1997. "Gravitationsfeld Gruppen: Zur Verschränkung der Werke Gesang der Jünglinge, Gruppen, und Zeitmasse und deren Auswirkung auf Stockhausens Musikdenken in der zweiten Hälfte der fünfziger Jahre". Musiktheorie 12, no. 1 (Analysieren und Hören neuer Musik, edited by Rainer Wehinger and Thomas Kabisch): 37–51.
 Decroupet, Pascal. 2012. "Le rôle des clés et algorithmes dans le décryptage analytique: L'exemple des musiques sérielles de Pierre Boulez, Karlheinz Stockhausen et Bernd Alois Zimmermann". Revue de Musicologie 98, no. 1:221–246.
 Decroupet, Pascal, and Elena Ungeheuer. 1993. "Son pur—bruit—médiations: Matières, matériaux et formes dans Gesang der Jünglinge de Karlheinz Stockhausen". Genesis 4:69–85.
 Frisius, Rudolf. 2008. Karlheinz Stockhausen II: Die Werke 1950–1977; Gespräch mit Karlheinz Stockhausen, "Es geht aufwärts". Mainz, London, Berlin, Madrid, New York, Paris, Prague, Tokyo, Toronto: Schott Musik International. .
 Goldberg, Albert. 12 March 1957. "The Sounding Board: Strange Music Heard at Monday Concert". Los Angeles Times, p. 27.
 Metzer, David. 2004. "The Paths from and to Abstraction in Stockhausen’s Gesang der Jünglinge". Modernism/Modernity 11, no. 4 (November): 695–721. 
 Metzer, David Joel. 2009. Musical Modernism at the Turn of the Twenty-first Century. Music in the Twentieth Century 26. Cambridge and New York: Cambridge University Press. .
 Plumb, Robert K. 24 June 1956. "Experts on Sound Pull New Strings: Congress on Acoustics Hears Electronic Music, Discusses Deceptive Tape Recording". The New York Times, p. 80.
 Sangild, Torben. 2005. "Elektronisk avantgarde—Stockhausens Gesang der Jünglinge" In En tradition af opbrud: avantgardernes tradition og politik, edited by Tania Ørum, Marianne Ping Huang, and Charlotte Engberg, 192–202. Hellerup: Forlaget Spring. .
 Schonberg, Harold C. 17 June 1956. "Splitting the Octave: I.S.C.M. Composer Believes He Can Break It Down into 42 Segments". The New York Times, p. 105.
 Stockhausen, Karlheinz. 1998. "Elektronische Musik seit 1952". In his Texte zur Musik 8 (1984–1991: Dienstag aus Licht; Elektronische Musik), edited by Christoph von Blumröder, 399–504. Kürten: Stockhausen-Verlag. .
 Stockhausen, Karlheinz. 2009. Kompositorische Grundlagen Neuer Musik: Sechs Seminare für die Darmstädter Ferienkurse 1970, edited by Imke Misch. Kürten: Stockhausen-Stiftung für Musik. .
 Toop, Richard. 1981. "Stockhausen's Electronic Works: Sketches and Worksheets from 1952-1967." Interface 10:149–197.
 Ungeheuer, Elena, and Pascal Decroupet. 1996. "Technik und Ästhetik der elektronischen Musik". In Musik und Technik: Fünf Kongreßbeiträge und vier Seminarberichte, edited by Rudolf Frisius and Helga de la Motte-Haber, 123–142. Veröffentlichungen des Instituts für Neue Musik und Musikerziehung Darmstadt 36. Mainz: Schott Musik International. .
 Ungeheuer, Elena, and Pascal Decroupet. 1998. "Materialen und Dramaturgie in Karlheinz Stockhausens Gesang der Jünglinge". Mitteilungen: Eine Publikation der Deutschen Gesellschaft für Elektroakustiche Musik DEGEM'', no. 30 (September): 27–39.

External links
 Gesang der Jünglinge page from the score: vocal complex IV
 Analyse perceptive de Gesang der Jünglinge de Karlheinz Stockhausen, by Sandrine Baranski 
 "Gesang der Jünglinge: History and Analysis", notes by John Smalley, for concert series, Masterpieces of 20th-Century Electronic Music: A Multimedia Perspective. The Columbia University Computer Music Center, presented by Lincoln Center (July 2000) .
 Gesang der Jünglinge (history, text, scores, equipment) Sounds in Space
 , Samuel Andreyev, 23 May 2017

20th-century classical music
Compositions by Karlheinz Stockhausen
1956 compositions
Serial compositions
Spatial music
Shadrach, Meshach, and Abednego
Electronic compositions